Castle Peak Road is the longest road in Hong Kong. Completed in 1920, it runs in the approximate shape of an arc of a semi-circle. It runs West from Tai Po Road in Sham Shui Po, New Kowloon, to Tuen Mun, then north to Yuen Long then east to Sheung Shui, in the very north of the New Territories. It is divided into 22 sections. It serves south, west and north New Territories, being one of the most distant roads in early Hong Kong.

Name

The road was named after Castle Peak, a peak in the western New Territories. The area to the east of the peak was hence named Castle Peak. Later at the dawn of the development of new town, the area was renamed to its old name, Tuen Mun.

The road was originally known in Chinese as Tsing Shan To for its entire length. The Chinese name of the section of the road in the New Territories was later changed to Tsing Shan Kung Lo Lit. "Castle Peak public road" or "Castle Peak Highway". In everyday conversation, however, the term Tsing Shan To survives for the stretches within Tsuen Wan and Yuen Long.

History
The road was constructed soon after the British leased the New Territories in 1898. Speaking in the Legislative Council in 1909, Governor Frederick Lugard cited the facilitation of trade and police control as reasons for the road's construction. It was built and gradually widened in sections.

Route

New Kowloon
The road starts east at Tai Po Road in Sham Shui Po and passes through Cheung Sha Wan and Lai Chi Kok in New Kowloon. On both sides of the road are old residential blocks, with some dated back to pre-World War II. Towards Lai Chi Kok, it is surrounded by industrial buildings instead. The road is one-way eastbound between Kom Tsun Street & its terminus at Tai Po Road.

New Territories

After leaving New Kowloon, it goes uphill past Kau Wa Keng and Tai Ching Cheung along a four-lane expressway to Kwai Chung and downhill into Tsuen Wan. The stretch within Tsuen Wan is also commonly called "main road", especially among the older generations.

Next, it goes along the south shore of the Western New Territories, via Yau Kom Tau, Ting Kau, Sham Tseng, Tsing Lung Tau, Tai Lam, Siu Lam and So Kwun Wat and then reaches the Tuen Mun New Town, which was also known as Castle Peak (after which the road was named). Much of this stretch was bypassed by Tuen Mun Road between 1977 and 1983.

It continues north-east as a six-laned road, paralleling the Light Rail through Lam Tei, Hung Shui Kiu, Ping Shan and goes through another new town, Yuen Long New Town. The section within Yuen Long, again, is also commonly called "main road". This section was bypassed by the Yuen Long Highway in 1992.

It then turns north at Au Tau, just west of Kam Tin. This section is paralleled by San Tin Highway, constructed between 1991 and 1993. It then passes through Mai Po, San Tin, Lok Ma Chau (near the Chinese border), Pak Shek Au and Kwu Tung before terminating at Fan Kam Road in Sheung Shui.

See also
 Hoh Fuk Tong Centre
 List of streets and roads in Hong Kong

References

External links

 Google Maps of Castle Peak Road

Sham Shui Po
Cheung Sha Wan
Lai Chi Kok
Kwai Chung
Tsuen Wan
Ting Kau
Sham Tseng
Tsing Lung Tau
Tuen Mun
Yuen Long
Sheung Shui
Roads in New Kowloon
Roads in the New Territories